Do You Love Your Mom and Her Two-Hit Multi-Target Attacks? is a light novel series written by Dachima Inaka, with illustrations by Pochi Iida. It was launched under Fujimi Shobo's Fujimi Fantasia Bunko label, with eleven volumes published from January 20, 2017 to April 17, 2020. During their panel at Sakura-Con on March 31, 2018, North American publisher Yen Press announced that they had licensed the series. The English version was translated by Andrew Cunningham.

A manga adaptation by Meicha was serialized in Kadokawa Shoten's Young Ace Up digital manga magazine from September 26, 2017 to January 18, 2021. The series was also serialized on Kadokawa's Comic Walker platform. Five tankōbon volumes were published from August 25, 2018 to February 4, 2021. The manga is also licensed in North America by Yen Press.


Volume list

Light novel

Manga

References

External links 
  

Lists of light novels
Lists of manga volumes and chapters